The Forty-Sixth Wisconsin Legislature convened from  to  in regular session.  During this legislative term but after the end of the legislative session, in February 1904, the Wisconsin State Capitol suffered a severe fire that destroyed two wings and damaged the rotunda.

This was the first legislative session after the redistricting of the Senate and Assembly according to acts of the previous session.  

Senators representing odd-numbered districts were newly elected for this session and were serving the first two years of a four-year term. Assembly members were elected to a two-year term. Assembly members and odd-numbered senators were elected in the general election of November 4, 1902. Senators representing even-numbered districts were serving the third and fourth year of a four-year term, having been elected in the general election of November 6, 1900.

Major events
 Unknown date: Harley-Davidson motorcycle company was founded in Milwaukee, Wisconsin.
 January 28, 1903: John Coit Spooner was re-elected United States Senator by the Wisconsin Legislature in joint session.
 February 23, 1903: Cuba leased Guantánamo Bay to the United States in perpetuity.
 March 20, 1903: Wisconsin Supreme Court justice Charles V. Bardeen died of cancer in Madison, Wisconsin.
 April 7, 1903: Wisconsin spring general election:
 Robert G. Siebecker was elected to the Wisconsin Supreme Court.
 Voters approved an amendment to the Wisconsin constitution to add two seats to the Wisconsin Supreme Court.
 April 9, 1903: Judge Robert G. Siebecker was appointed to begin his term early on the Wisconsin Supreme Court by Governor 
 June 16, 1903: The Ford Motor Company was founded in Detroit, Michigan.
 July 20, 1903: Pope Leo XIII died at the Apostolic Palace in Rome.
 August 9, 1903: Coronation of Cardinal Giuseppe Melchiorre Sarto as Pope Pius X.
 September 11, 1903: The first stock-car race was held at the Milwaukee Mile in Milwaukee County, Wisconsin.
 October 1, 1903: The first game of the modern World Series of baseball was held in Boston, Massachusetts.
 November 3, 1903: With the support of the United States, Panama declared it's independence from Colombia.
 November 18, 1903: The Hay–Bunau-Varilla Treaty was signed by the United States and Panama, giving the United States exclusive rights to the Panama Canal Zone.
 December 17, 1903: The Wright brothers Wright Flyer made the first powered, controlled flight of a heavier-than-air aircraft at Kitty Hawk, North Carolina.
 December 30, 1903: The Iroquois Theatre fire in Chicago, Illinois, killed 602.
 January 1, 1904: Frederick Pabst, founder of the Pabst Brewing Company, died in Milwaukee, Wisconsin.
 February 8, 1904: The Empire of Japan launched a surprise attack on Russian Dalian, igniting the Russo-Japanese War.
 February 26, 1904: A gas jet ignited the newly varnished ceiling of the Wisconsin State Capitol, starting a fire that would burn down most of the building.
 April 8, 1904: The Entente Cordiale was signed by the United Kingdom and France.
 May 4, 1904: United States Army engineers began work on the Panama Canal.
 May 21, 1904: The International Federation of Association Football, FIFA, was founded.
 July 1, 1904: Start of the 1904 Summer Olympics in St. Louis, Missouri.  These were the third modern Olympics and the first held in the United States.
 July 30, 1904: Wisconsin Governor Robert La Follette removed the state treasurer, John J. Kempf, from office for his failure to give the required bond for the office.
 November 8, 1904: 1904 United States general election:
 Theodore Roosevelt re-elected as President of the United States.
 Robert M. La Follette re-elected to a third term as Governor of Wisconsin.
 Wisconsin voters approved a referendum to utilize primary elections for party nominations for state offices.
 December 6, 1904: President Theodore Roosevelt declared his Corollary to the Monroe Doctrine, stating that the United States will intervene in the Western Hemisphere where Latin American governments prove incapable or unstable.
 December 31, 1904: The first New Year's Eve celebration was held at Times Square, New York City.

Major legislation
 March 24, 1903: An Act to provide for making nominations and for filing nomination papers for the office of Associate Justice of the Supreme Court for the term commencing on the first Monday of January 1904, and for placing the names of the nominees for such office on the official ballot, 1903 Act 27.  Set up a special period for new nominations for the Wisconsin Supreme Court election set to be held in April 1903, due to the death of the incumbent justice Charles V. Bardeen, who had been set to run for re-election.
 March 27, 1903: An Act relating to the duties, qualifications and salary of the state superintendent, 1903 Act 37.  Using a new amendment to the state constitution to define the office of the state superintendent of public instruction.
 April 3, 1903: An Act to provide for state insurance on public buildings, and making an appropriation therefor, 1903 Act 68.  Terminated existing state fire insurance—10 months before the Capitol suffered a severe fire.
 May 13, 1903: An Act for the creation of banks and for the regulation and supervision of the banking business, 1903 Act 234.  Utilized the new amendment to the state constitution to regulate banking and establish the Wisconsin Department of Banking.
 May 20, 1903: An Act to provide for the protection of employees and sanitation in certain buildings, 1903 Act 323. 
 May 23, 1903: An Act to provide for party nominations by direct vote, 1903 Act 451.  Set methodology for party nominations to be determined via primary elections rather than nominating conventions, and proposed a referendum to have the plan ratified by voters.  
 Joint Resolution agreeing to the proposed amendment to the constitution, 1903 Joint Resolution 7.  This was the second required legislative passage of the constitutional amendment to expand the Wisconsin Supreme Court to 7 seats.  The amendment was then ratified by voters in the 1903 Spring election.
 Joint Resolution, 1903 Joint Resolution 9.  Calling for a federal constitutional convention to draft an amendment to the United States Constitution for the popular election of United States senators.
 Joint Resolution providing for an amendment to section 1, article VIII, of the Constitution, relating to taxation, 1903 Joint Resolution 11.  Proposed an amendment to the Wisconsin constitution to allow a graduated income tax.

Summary

Senate summary

Assembly summary

Sessions
 1st Regular session: January 14, 1903May 23, 1903

Leaders

Senate leadership
 President of the Senate: James O. Davidson (R) 
 President pro tempore: James J. McGillivray (R–Black River Falls)

Assembly leadership
 Speaker of the Assembly: Irvine Lenroot (R–Superior)

Members

Members of the Senate
Members of the Senate for the Forty-Sixth Wisconsin Legislature:

Members of the Assembly
Members of the Assembly for the Forty-Sixth Wisconsin Legislature:

Committees

Senate committees
 Senate Committee on AgricultureG. Wylie, chair
 Senate Committee on Assessment and Collection of TaxesJ. M. Whitehead, chair
 Senate Committee on Banks and InsuranceJ. E. Roehr, chair
 Senate Committee on Bills on Third ReadingR. Reukema, chair
 Senate Committee on CorporationsJ. H. Green, chair
 Senate Committee on EducationJ. H. Stout, chair
 Senate Committee on Enrolled BillsC. Sarau, chair
 Senate Committee on Engrossed BillsG. B. Hudnall, chair
 Senate Committee on Federal RelationsH. C. Martin, chair
 Senate Committee on the JudiciaryA. L. Kreutzer, chair
 Senate Committee on Legislative ExpensesO. W. Johnson, chair
 Senate Committee on Manufactures and LaborG. P. Miller, chair
 Senate Committee on Military AffairsE. E. Burns, chair
 Senate Committee on Privileges and ElectionsE. D. Morse, chair
 Senate Committee on Public HealthB. A. Eaton, chair
 Senate Committee on Public LandsC. C. Rogers, chair
 Senate Committee on RailroadsT. A. Willy, chair
 Senate Committee on Roads and BridgesG. W. Wolff, chair
 Senate Committee on State AffairsW. H. Hatten, chair
 Senate Committee on Town and County OrganizationsW. O'Neil, chair

Assembly committees
 Assembly Committee on AgricultureR. Ainsworth, chair
 Assembly Committee on Assessment and Collection of TaxesS. E. Smalley, chair
 Assembly Committee on Bills on Third ReadingF. H. Lord, chair
 Assembly Committee on CitiesG. H. Ray, chair
 Assembly Committee on CorporationsI. B. Bradford, chair
 Assembly Committee on Dairy and FoodS. D. Slade, chair
 Assembly Committee on EducationJ. Johnston, chair
 Assembly Committee on Enrolled BillsG. E. Beedle, chair
 Assembly Committee on Engrossed BillsO. G. Kinney, chair
 Assembly Committee on Federal RelationsF. Hartung, chair
 Assembly Committee on Finance, Banks and InsuranceN. E. Lane, chair
 Assembly Committee on the JudiciaryF. A. Cady, chair
 Assembly Committee on Legislative ExpendituresT. Johnson, chair
 Assembly Committee on Lumber and MiningH. Johnson, chair
 Assembly Committee on ManufacturesG. Rankl, chair
 Assembly Committee on Military AffairsA. E. Smith, chair
 Assembly Committee on Privileges and ElectionsW. W. Andrew, chair
 Assembly Committee on Public Health and SanitationE. W. Whitson, chair
 Assembly Committee on Public ImprovementsW. B. Bartlett, chair
 Assembly Committee on Public LandsG. P. Stevens, chair
 Assembly Committee on RailroadsC. W. Gilman, chair
 Assembly Committee on Roads and BridgesB. S. Peterson, chair
 Assembly Committee on State AffairsW. L. Root, chair
 Assembly Committee on Town and County OrganizationD. Hodgins, chair
 Assembly Committee on Ways and MeansJ. Willott, chair

Joint committees
 Joint Committee on Charitable and Penal InstitutionsMosher(Sen.) & A. H. Dahl (Asm.), co-chairs
 Joint Committee on ClaimsHagemeister (Sen.) & D. Evans (Asm.), co-chairs
 Joint Committee on Fish and GameWipperman (Sen.) & C. L. Valentine (Asm.), co-chairs
 Joint Committee on Forestry and LumberMcDonough (Sen.) & S. Thoreson (Asm.), co-chairs
 Joint Committee on PrintingMunson (Sen.) & W. C. Cowling (Asm.), co-chairs
 Special Joint Committee on Coal SupplyMcGillivray (Sen.) & A. H. Dahl (Asm.), co-chairs
 Special Joint Committee on RulesGaveney (Sen.) & F. A. Cady (Asm.), co-chairs

Employees

Senate employees
 Chief Clerk: Theodore W. Goldin
 Journal Clerk: F. E. Andrews
 Bookkeeper: J. D. O'Brien
 General Clerk: Frank M. Welch
 Engrossing Clerk: H. Wipperman Jr.
 Enrolling Clerk: W. V. Dorwin
 Sergeant-at-Arms: Sanfield MacDonald
 Assistant Sergeant-at-Arms: Joseph Elliott
 Document Clerk: B. H. Straw
 Postmaster: Christoph Paulus

Assembly employees
 Chief Clerk: C. O. Marsh
 Journal Clerk: W. W. Powell
 Bookkeeper: Chas. A. Leicht
 General Clerk: C. E. Shaffer
 2nd General Clerk: Chas. J. Good
 Enrolling Clerk: A. W. Potts
 Engrossing Clerk: Chas. W. Blay 
 Sergeant-at-Arms: A. M. Anderson
 Assistant Sergeant-at-Arms: John H. White
 2nd Assistant Sergeant-at-Arms: M. E. Henika
 Document Clerk: W. A. Nowell
 Postmaster: F. M. Roberts

Changes from the 45th Legislature
New districts for the 46th Legislature were defined in 1901 Wisconsin Act 164 (Assembly districts) and 1901 Wisconsin Act 309 (Senate districts), passed into law in the 45th Wisconsin Legislature.

Senate redistricting

Summary of changes
 24 districts were left unchanged 
 Rock County became a single district again (22) after previously having been divided between two districts.

Senate districts

Assembly redistricting

Summary of changes
 Ashland County became its own district after previously having been in a shared district with Iron County.
 Lincoln County became its own district after previously having been in a shared district with Taylor County.
 Marinette County went from having 1 district to 2.
 Milwaukee County went from having 15 districts to 16.
 Portage County went from having 2 districts to 1.
 Sheboygan County went from having 3 districts to 2.
 Walworth County went from having 2 districts to 1.

Assembly districts

Notes

References

External links
 1903: Related Documents from Wisconsin Legislature

1903 in Wisconsin
1904 in Wisconsin
Wisconsin
Wisconsin legislative sessions